Ercole Lupinacci  (23 November 1933 – 6 August 2016) was an Italian of Arbëreshë ethnicity and Bishop Emeritus  of Italo-Albanian Catholic Eparchies of Piana degli Albanesi and Lungro.

Biography
Ercole Lupinacci was born in San Giorgio Albanese on 23 November 1933. He was ordained an Italo-Albanian Catholic priest on 22 November 1959.  He was appointed Bishop of Piana degli Abanesi on 25 March 1981 and ordained bishop on 8 August 1981 by Bishop Giovanni Stamati with principal co-consecrators, Archbishop Saba Youakim, B.S. and Archbishop Miroslav Stefan Marusyn.

On 22 November 1987, he was appointed Bishop of Lungro replacing the deceased Bishop Stamati. He retired from the See of Lungro on 10 August 2010 at age 76, and died on 6 August 2016, aged 82.

Episcopal Genealogy
Eparch Isaias Papadopoulos 
Eparch John Mele 
Eparch Giovanni Stamati 
Eparch Ercole Lupinacci

References

External links
Intervista a Ercole Lupinacci: Noi cristiani né uniati né ortodossi
Bishop Ercole Lupinacci at catholic-hierarchy.org 

1933 births
2016 deaths

Italian people of Arbëreshë descent
People from San Giorgio Albanese
Bishops of Piana degli Albanesi